The 1977 AIAW women's basketball tournament was held on March 23–26, 1977.  The host site was the University of Minnesota in Minneapolis, Minnesota.  Sixteen teams participated, and Delta State University was crowned national champion at the conclusion of the tournament for the third straight season.

The 1976–1977 season also marked the release of the first AP Poll for women's basketball.  Delta State finished first in the final poll, which was released prior to the 1977 AIAW Tournament.

Tournament bracket

Main bracket

Consolation bracket

See also
 1977 AIAW National Small College Basketball Championship

References

AIAW women's basketball tournament
AIAW
AIAW National Division I Basketball Championship
1977 in sports in Minnesota
Women's sports in Minnesota